Nestor, the Long-Eared Christmas Donkey is a 1977 Christmas stop motion animated television special produced by Rankin/Bass Productions. It premiered on ABC on December 3, 1977. The story is based on the 1975 song of the same name, written by Gene Autry, Don Pfrimmer and Dave Burgess.

Plot 
Santa Claus' donkey, Spieltoe, narrates the story of a donkey named Nestor with abnormally long ears, who lived in the days of the Roman Empire. Every animal in the stable ridicules Nestor because of his ears. This seemingly comes to a halt during the celebration of winter solstice. Nestor's mother gives socks to Nestor to cover his ears.

That night, soldiers arrive from the Roman Empire in need of donkeys. After removing the socks from Nestor’s ears, the soldiers think that the owner of the stable, Olaf, was trying to trick them. Olaf offers to give them Nestor for free, but the soldiers instead take all of the other donkeys for free but leave Nestor. Enraged, Olaf throws Nestor out into a blizzard, where Nestor's mother sacrifices her life to shield him from the cold.

Later, Nestor meets a cherub named Tilly. She says they need to travel to Bethlehem, telling him "Your ears can do wondrous things no other ears can do. The sounds they hear will guide you on a path that's straight and true, and then you will save another, as your mother once saved you." They travel across the desert sands for many months, and when they finally get to the outskirts of Bethlehem, Tilly tells Nestor to wait. Even though he finds a rundown old stable, nobody buys him.

Mary and Joseph are expecting Jesus, they take Nestor because of his "gentle eyes", but are caught in a sandstorm. In the midst of the storm, Nestor hears Tilly's voice, but recognizes it as his mother's, and she tells him to follow the voices of the angels. Nestor guides Mary and Joseph through the storm, wrapping Mary in his ears, soon arriving at Bethlehem. They find the stable where Mary subsequently gives birth to Jesus, Nestor finds his way back to his home stable where he is hailed by Olaf and the other animals.

Cast 
 Roger Miller as Spieltoe
 Eric Stern as Nestor
 Brenda Vaccaro as Tilly
 Paul Frees as Olaf the Stable Owner, a Donkey Dealer, and Santa Claus
 Linda Gary as Nestor's Mother
 Iris Rainer and Shelly Hines as Nestor's friends
 Don Messick as a Roman Soldier
 Taryn Davies as Mary
 Harry Maurice Rosner as Joseph

Crew 
 Produced and Directed by Arthur Rankin Jr. and Jules Bass
 Assistant Producer: Masaki Iizuka
 Written by Romeo Muller
 Based on the Song by Gene Autry, Don Pfrimmer and Dave Burgess
 Additional Music and Lyrics by Maury Laws and Jules Bass
 Design by Paul Coker, Jr.
 "Animagic" Supervisors: Akikazu Kono and Satoshi Fujino
 Sound Recorders: John Curcio and Joe Jorgensen
 Music Arranged and Conducted by Maury Laws

Production 
In addition to Akikazu Kono, this is Rankin/Bass' second and last "Animagic" stop motion puppet production to be supervised by another Japanese animator, Satoshi Fujino, who also previously worked on The Little Drummer Boy, Book II.

Home video 
The special was released in 2000 with The Year Without a Santa Claus.

See also
List of Christmas films
List of Rankin/Bass Productions films

References

External links 

1977 animated films
1977 films
1977 in American television
1970s American animated films
1977 television specials
1970s animated short films
1970s American television specials
American Broadcasting Company television specials
American children's animated fantasy films
1970s animated television specials
Christmas characters
Nativity of Jesus on television
Films scored by Maury Laws
Films about donkeys
Films about the Nativity of Jesus
Television shows directed by Jules Bass
Television shows directed by Arthur Rankin Jr.
Stop-motion animated short films
Rankin/Bass Productions television specials
Stop-motion animated television shows
Television shows written by Romeo Muller